Darlington Lake is a lake located on Vancouver Island south of Mount Grey.

Hydrology

Access

Fishing

References

Alberni Valley
Lakes of Vancouver Island
Barclay Land District